My Utmost for His Highest is the first of three albums of songs inspired by Oswald Chambers' devotional My Utmost for His Highest.  The album, produced by Brown Bannister, features performances by popular Christian musicians of songs relating to a day from Chamber's book. It was the first album to receive the GMA Dove Award for Special Event Album of the Year, and was nominated for a Grammy Award for Best Pop/Contemporary Gospel Album.

The two additional albums produced in the series were My Utmost for His Highest: The Covenant and My Utmost for His Highest: Quiet Prayers.

My Utmost for His Highest

Track listing
"You Are Holy" (Carolyn Arends, Mark Harris, Michael W. Smith) – 4:56; performed by 4Him
"Lover of My Soul" (Amy Grant, Michael Omartian) – 5:14; performed by Amy Grant
"A Man After Your Own Heart" (Wayne Kirkpatrick, Billy Sprague) – 4:31; performed by Gary Chapman
"You'll Be There" (Cindy Morgan) – 3:21; performed by Cindy Morgan
"Sometimes He Comes In The Clouds" (Steven Curtis Chapman) – 4:01; performed by Steven Curtis Chapman
"God of All of Me" (Bob Farrell, MWS) – 4:45; performed by Sandi Patty
"Move In Me" (Wayne Kirkpatrick, MWS) – 6:10; performed by Michael W. Smith
"Hold On to Me" (Robert Sterling, MWS) – 4:00; performed by Point of Grace
"A Heart Like Mine" (Loren Balman, Robbie Buchanan, Bryan Duncan, Bob Farrell, Greg Nelson)- 4:23; performed by Bryan Duncan
"Where He Leads Me" (Twila Paris) – 5:33; performed by Twila Paris
"Shine On Us" (MWS, Debbie Smith) – 4:00; performed by Phillips, Craig and Dean

Personnel 
 Shane Keister – keyboards (1, 4, 7, 8), acoustic piano (10)
 Blair Masters – additional keyboards (1, 3), keyboards (7)
 Tommy Sims – programming (2, 5), backing vocals (4), bass (5), additional programming (6), keyboards (10)
 Michael Omartian – acoustic piano (3)
 Carl Marsh – keyboards (5, 8, 10)
 Danny Duncan – additional programming (5, 6)
 Robbie Buchanan – programming (6, 9)
 Michael W. Smith – acoustic piano (7)
 Brian Siewert – programming (11)
 Dann Huff – guitar (1, 2, 4, 6–9)
 Don Potter – acoustic guitar (1, 4, 7, 8, 10)
 Steven Curtis Chapman – acoustic guitar (5)
 Gordon Kennedy – acoustic guitar (5), electric guitar (5), guitar (9)
 Leland Sklar – bass (1, 4, 7, 9)
 Steve Brewster – drums (1, 4, 7, 8)
 Paul Leim – drums (9)
 Ronn Huff – string arrangements (1–4, 6, 7, 11)
 Tom Howard – string arrangements (9)
 Gavyn Wright – concertmaster (1–4, 6, 7, 9, 11)
 The London Session Orchestra – strings (1–4, 6, 7, 9, 11)
 Cheryl Rogers – vocal arrangement (8)
 Lisa Keith – backing vocals (2, 9)
 Michael Mellett – backing vocals (2, 3, 5, 10)
 Nicol Sponberg – backing vocals (2, 9)
 Molly Felder – backing vocals (4)
 Cindy Morgan – backing vocals (4)
 Wayne Kirkpatrick – backing vocals (7)

Production 
 Producer – Brown Bannister 
 Executive Producer – Loren Balman
 BGV Production on Tracks 2 & 9 – Tommy Sims
 Vocal Production on Track 11 – Paul Mills
 Engineers – Jeff Balding and Steve Bishir
 Additional Engineers – Brown Bannister, Patrick Kelly and Martin Woodlee.
 Assistant Engineers – Joey Grimstead, Aaron Swihart, Carry Summers and Martin Woodlee.
 Recorded at The Dugout and OmniSound Studios (Nashville, Tennessee);  Tejas Recorders and Deer Valley Studio (Franklin, Tennessee); Vintage Recorders (Phoenix, Arizona).
 Strings recorded by Bill Price at Angel Studios (London, UK), assisted by Niall Acott.
 Mixing – Bill Deaton (Tracks 1–4 & 6–10); Steve Bishir (Tracks 5 & 9).
 Mix Assistants – Patrick Kelly, Aaron Swihart, Daron Smith and Carry Summers.
 Mixed at OmniSound Studios and Quad Studios (Nashville, Tennessee); Gambit Studio (Gallatin, Tennessee).
 Mastered by Stephen Marcussen at Precision Mastering (Hollywood, California).
 Production Coordination – Traci Sterling

My Utmost for His Highest: The Covenant

Track listing
"All of Me" (Cindy Morgan, Michael W. Smith) – 4:32; performed by BeBe Winans
"Reprise (All of Me)"- 5:02; performed by The London Session Orchestra
"The Covenant" (David Mullen, Tommy Sims) – 5:00; performed by Anointed
"Someday (Set the Children Free)" (David Mullen, MWS) – 5:35; performed by Michael W. Smith
"Through All the Years" (David Mullen, Loren Balman, John Mandeville) – 4:09; performed by Greg Long and Joanna Carlson
"Psalm 121" (Tommy Greer) – 4:24; performed by Susan Ashton
"Make It a Promise" (Bob Farrell, Robbie Buchanan) – 4:23; performed by Clay Crosse
"I Will Follow You" (Dino Elefante, John Elefante) – 4:46; performed by John Elefante and Lisa Bevill
"Reprise (My Utmost For His Highest)" – 6:14; performed by The London Session Orchestra
"Joyful, Joyful We Adore Thee" – 4:37; performed by Michael W. Smith and Anointed

Personnel 
 Shane Keister – keyboards (1, 3, 4, 5, 7), acoustic piano (3, 5, 6, 10), programming (4)
 Blair Masters – keyboards (6)
 John Elefante – keyboards (8)
 Michael Omartian – acoustic piano (8)
 Michael W. Smith – acoustic piano (10), programming (10), arrangements (10)
 Brian D. Siewert – additional keyboard programming 
 Jerry McPherson – guitar (1), electric guitar (3–7, 10), mandolin (10)
 Don Potter – acoustic guitar (3, 5, 7, 10)
 Mark Casstevens – acoustic guitar (3)
 Dann Huff – electric guitar (5, 6)
 Daryl Scott – acoustic guitar (6)
 Phil Madeira – electric guitar (6), Hammond B3 organ (6, 10)
 Glenn Pearce – guitar (8)
 Gordon Kennedy – electric guitar (10)
 Byron House – bass (1)
 Tommy Sims – bass (3–7, 10)
 Jackie Street – bass (8)
 Steve Brewster – drums (1, 3–7, 10)
 Scott Williamson – drums (8)
 Eric Darken – percussion (1)
 Carl Marsh – string arrangements (1–6), orchestral arrangements (2, 9)
 Ronn Huff – string arrangements (7, 8)
 Gavyn Wright – concertmaster (1–9)
 The London Session Orchestra – strings (1–9)
 Cindy Morgan – backing vocals (1)
 Lisa Bevill – backing vocals (4, 5, 6)
 Jim Chaffee – backing vocals (4)
 Marabeth Jordan – backing vocals (4)
 Michael Mellett – backing vocals (4, 5, 7)
 Chris Rodriguez – backing vocals (4)
 Nicol Sponberg – backing vocals (4, 5, 6)
 Robert White Johnson – backing vocals (4, 5)
 The Kid Connection Choir – backing vocals (4)
 The Born Again Church Choir – choir (10)

Production 
 Producers – Tommy Sims (Tracks 1, 3, 6 & 7); Brown Bannister (Tracks 2, 6, 9 & 10); Shane Keister (Tracks 4 & 5); Dino and John Elefante (Track 8).
 Executive Producers – Loren Balman and Brown Bannister
 Recorded by Steve Bishir
 Assistant Recording – Hank Nirider and Martin Woodlee
 Assistant Engineers – John Angelini, Carl Meadows, Aaron Swihart, John Thomas and Jasyn Wilder.
 Additional Engineers – John Angelini, Jeff Balding, Bob Cadway, Steven J. Calleja, Dino Elefante, Shane Keister, Bryan Lenox,  Hank Nirider, David Shackney, Brian D. Siewert and Martin Woodlee.
 Recorded at The Dugout (Nashville, Tennessee).
 Overdubbed at OmniSound Studios, Battery Studios, Javelina Recording Studios, Sound Emporium and The Coloring Book (Nashville, Tennessee); The Snack Bar (Brentwood, Tennessee); Sound Kitchen and Deer Valley Studios (Franklin, Tennessee); Cove City Sound Studios (Long Island, New York).
 Orchestra recorded by Rupert Coulson at AIR Lyndhurst Hall (London, UK).
 Mixing – Steve Bishir (Tracks 1, 3 & 6); Bill Deaton (Tracks 2, 4, 5, 7, 9 & 10); Terry Christian (Track 8).
 Mix Assistants – Carl Meadows (Tracks 1, 3 & 6); Carry Summers (Tracks 2, 4, 5, 7, 9 & 10); John Dickson (Track 8).
 Mixed at Sound Emporium and Soundshop Recording Studios (Nashville, Tennessee); Gambit Studio (Gallatin, Tennessee).
 Mastered by Doug Sax at The Mastering Lab (Hollywood, California).
 Production Manager – Traci Sterling Bishir

My Utmost for His Highest: Quiet Prayers

Track listing
Note: All songs performed by Bryan Duncan
"Bryan's Hymn (When I Turn To You)" (Bryan Duncan, James Felix) – 5:16
"O Love That Will Not Let Me Go" – 5:48
"I Surrender All" – 2:16
"Beneath the Cross of Jesus" (instrumental) – 2:03
"Come, Holy Spirit" (Bill Gaither, Gloria Gaither) – 3:27
"Take My Life and Let It Be" – 1:57
"A Heart Like Mine" (instrumental) (Duncan, Loren Balman, Robbie Buchanan, Bob Farrell, Greg Nelson) – 3:15
"I Need Thee Every Hour" – 3:19
"El Shaddai" (Michael Card, John Thompson) / "You Are My Hiding Place  (Instrumental)" (Michael Ledner) – 4:49
"As The Deer" (Martyn Nydstrom) – 1:43
"Bryan's Prayer (I Love You with My Life)" (Duncan) – 4:50

Personnel 
 Bryan Duncan – vocals (1, 2, 3, 5, 6, 8, 10, 11)
 Robbie Buchanan – keyboards, arrangements (5)
 Tom Howard – acoustic piano, arrangements (1–4, 6–11)
 John Darnall – guitar 
 Dean Parks – guitar
 Jimmy Johnson – bass
 Luis Conte – percussion 
 Sam Levine – soprano saxophone 
 Nashville String Machine – strings

Production 
 Producer – Dan Posthuma
 Recorded by Dan Garcia
 Strings recorded by Dave Murphy 
 Recorded at A to Z Studios (San Dimas, CA), Track Record (North Hollywood, California) and Great Circle Sound (Nashville, Tennessee).
 Mixing – Bill Schnee (Tracks 1–6 & 8–11); Paul Salveson (Track 7).
 Mixed at Bill Schnee Studios (North Hollywood, California) and Woodland Studios (Nashville, Tennessee).
 Mastered by Hank Williams at MasterMix (Nashville, Tennessee).

References

Contemporary Christian music compilation albums
1995 compilation albums
Albums produced by Brown Bannister